Ablepharus tragbulensis is a species of skink endemic to South Asia.

Geographic range
A. tragbulensis is found in India, and possibly Pakistan.

Type locality: "Tragbal [sic] Pass, at an elevation of about 9,000 feet". [= Tragbul Pass (34° 29' N, 74° 40' E), about   NNW of Srinagar, Kashmir, India and Pakistan, ].

References

Further reading
Alcock AW. 1898. Report on the Natural History Results of the Pamir Boundary Commission. Calcutta [1897]: Office of the Superintendent of Government Printing, India. 45 pp. + five plates. (Lygosoma himalayanum var. tragbulensis, new variation, p. 36).
Das I, Dattagupta B, Gayen N. 1998. Systematic status of Lygosoma himalayanum tragbulensis Alcock, "1897" 1898 (Sauria:  Scincidae) collected by the Pamir boundary commission, 1885. Russ. J. Herpetol. 5 (2): 147-150.
Shea GM, Greer AE. 2002. From Sphenomorphus to Lipinia: Generic reassignment of two poorly known New Guinea skinks. Journal of Herpetology 36 (2): 148-156.

Ablepharus
Reptiles described in 1898
Taxa named by Alfred William Alcock